Sahitya Akademi Award is given by the Sahitya Akademi, India’s national academy of letters, to one writer every year in each of the languages recognized by it, as well as for translations. The Sahitya Akademi Award is the second highest literary award of India after the Jnanpith Award, and is annually conferred on writers of outstanding works in one of the twenty four major Indian languages that the Sahitya Akademi supports.
 
The Sahitya Akademi Award to Dogri writers is awarded to Dogri writers for works in Dogri and English. The award for Dogri language started in 1970. No awards were given in 1973, 1993 and 1998. The award may also be given to translations from Dogri literature.

Winners

References 

Dogri language
Dogri
Lists of books